Russet apples are varieties and cultivars of apples that regularly exhibit russeting, partial or complete coverage with rough patches of greenish-brown to yellowish-brown colour. While russeting is generally an undesirable trait in modern cultivars, russet varieties are often seen as more traditional, and associated with aromatic flavours.

Overview
Many apple cultivars have some natural russeting, but some are almost entirely covered in it, notably the Egremont Russet. Russet apples often exhibit a scent and flavour reminiscent of nuts, and are often very sweet. Despite this, modern apple breeders rarely accept russeting in new apple cultivars. The amount of russeting can be affected by various factors including, weather, disease or pest damage and agrochemical applications (e.g. insecticides, fungicides and growth regulators).

Russet apples also go under the name "rusticoat", "russeting" and "leathercoat". The last name was known in Shakespeare's time; for instance, in Henry IV, part 2, Davy says to Bardolph, "there's a dish of leathercoats for you".

Types

'Acklam Russet'
'Adam's Pearmain'
'Ashmead's Kernel'
'Blenheim Orange'
'Belle de Boskoop
'Braddick's Nonpareil'
'Claygate Pearmain'
'Egremont Russet'
'English Russet'
'Golden Russet'
'Hereford Russet'
'Knobby Russet'
'Merton Russet'
'Nonpareil'
'Reinette du Canada'
'Ribston Pippin'
'Ross Nonpareil'
'Roxbury Russet' (also known as Boston Russet)
'Rudford Russet'
'St Edmund's Pippin'
'Sam Young'
'Tydeman's Late Orange'
'Winston'

See also 

 Pyrus pyrifolia (also known as Japanese pear)

References

Apples